San Martino Buon Albergo is a comune (municipality) in the Province of Verona in the Italian region Veneto, located about  west of Venice and about  east of Verona.

San Martino Buon Albergo borders the following municipalities: Caldiero, Lavagno, Mezzane di Sotto, San Giovanni Lupatoto, Verona, and Zevio.

Transport
San Martino Buon Albergo railway station

Twin towns

 Voitsberg, Austria

Notable people
Egidio Micheloni, footballer

References

External links
 Official website

Cities and towns in Veneto